General elections were held in Surinam on 14 February and 23 March 1938 to choose the ten elected members of the Estates. Grace Schneiders-Howard was the only female candidate and was successful in the second round of voting, becoming the first woman elected in the Surinamese legislature.

Electoral system
The elections were held using a two-round system in a single nationwide constituency. To be elected in the first round, a candidate had to receive more votes than 50% of the valid ballots cast. If a second round was required the number of candidates was twice the number of seats available. Suffrage was limited to men paying poll tax, although women were allowed to stand as candidates.

Campaign
A total of 22 candidates contested the ten seats. Although not able to vote, a group of creole market women set up the Social Democratic Women's League to campaign for Schneiders-Howard.

Results
Six candidates were elected in the first round, receiving 619 or more votes. A further four were elected in the second. Seven of the winning candidates were incumbent members.

Aftermath
Following the elections, five additional members were appointed by the Governor on 30 March: Rachoenandan Brahma Tewari, Nicolaas Cornelis van Gheel Gildemeester, Jagesar Persad Kaulesar Sukul, Hendrik Miskin and Willem Vogel.

Karel Johannes van Erpecum became Chairman of the Estates and Philip Samson vice-president.

References

Elections in Suriname
1938 elections in South America
1938 in Suriname